Ferdinando "Nando" Gazzolo (16 October 1928 – 16 November 2015) was an Italian actor and voice actor.

Biography
Born in Savona, the son of the actor and voice actor Lauro Gazzolo and EIAR radio announcer Aida Ottaviani Piccolo, Gazzolo debuted at young age on radio, and in 1948, at twenty years old, he started his acting career entering the stage company led by Antonio Gandusio.  He achieved his first personal success in 1951, in the adaptation of Antonio e Cleopatra staged by Renzo Ricci. He later worked on stage with Vittorio Gassman and Luigi Squarzina, among others, before focusing in voice acting and dubbing.  Gazzolo was also active in films and starred in several TV-series of good success.

As a voice actor, Gazzolo served as the regular dubbing voice for Peter Cushing, David Niven and Richard Widmark. Other actors he occasionally dubbed included Rex Harrison, Michael Caine, Frank Sinatra, Yul Brynner, Marlon Brando, Robert Duvall, Donald Sutherland, Laurence Olivier, Clint Eastwood, Louis Jourdan, Henry Fonda and was also the voice of the narrator in the Italian dubbed version of Beauty and the Beast.

Personal life
Gazzolo was married with three children. One of whom, Matteo, is also an actor. He also had a half-brother, Virginio, from his father's second marriage.

Death
Gazzolo died on 16 November 2015 in Nepi, aged 87.

Filmography

Cinema
 Black Sunday (1960) - Narrator (voice, uncredited)
 Constantine and the Cross (1961) - Licinius
 The Trojan Horse (1961)
 Jeff Gordon, Secret Agent (1963) - Le docteur Mercier
 Toto and Cleopatra (1963) - Narrator (voice, uncredited)
 Il mistero del tempio indiano (1963) - Narrator (voice)
 La Cittadella (1964, TV Mini-Series) - Freddie Hamson
 Gladiators Seven (1964) - Sar / Milo
 Pirates of Malaysia (1964) - Lt. Clintock
 West and Soda (1965) - Johnny (voice)
 The Spy with Ten Faces (1966) - Kobras
 The Hills Run Red (1966) - Ken Seagull / Ken Milton
 Django Shoots First (1966) - Ken Kluster
 La volpe e le camelie (1966)
 Un caso di coscienza (1970) - Alfredo Serpieri
 Maddalena (1971)
 Il nano e la strega (1973) - Narratore (voice)
 Angeli a sud (1992)
 Magnificat (1993) - Narrator (voice)
 Valeria medico legale (2000-2002, TV Series) - Il procuratore
 The Comeback (2001)
 Our Tropical Island (2001) - Tacchini
 Le ragioni del cuore (2002, TV Mini-Series)
 Il sottile fascino del peccato (2010) - Padre Edo (final film role)

Dubbing roles

Animation
Narrator in Beauty and the Beast

Live action
Phileas Fogg in Around the World in 80 Days
Raymond in Bonjour Tristesse
Major David Angus Pollock in Separate Tables
Miles Doughton in Ask Any Girl
Chris Walters in Happy Anniversary
Lawrence Mackay in Please Don't Eat the Daisies
Corporal Miller in The Guns of Navarone
Sir Charles Lytton in The Pink Panther
Lawrence Jameson in Bedtime Story
James Bond in Casino Royale
Colonel Race in Death on the Nile
Memnon in Alexander the Great
Sherlock Holmes in The Hound of the Baskervilles
John Banning in The Mummy
Abraham Van Helsing in The Brides of Dracula
Dr. Namaroff in The Gorgon
Dr. Schreck in Dr. Terror's House of Horrors
Mike King in How the West Was Won
Johnny Gannon in Warlock
Clint Hollister in The Law and Jake Wade
William Edwards in Time Limit
Tom Rossiter in Alvarez Kelly
Ralph Anderson in The Trap
Rolfe in The Long Ships
Henry Higgins in My Fair Lady
Doctor John Dolittle in Doctor Dolittle
Old Man Marley in Home Alone
Cledus "Snowman" Snow in Smokey and the Bandit
Ross Webster in Superman III
Matthew Yelland in The Final Countdown

References

External links

1928 births
2015 deaths
People from Savona
Italian male stage actors
Italian male film actors
Italian male television actors
Italian male voice actors
Italian male radio actors
20th-century Italian male actors